American Tongues is a 1988 sociolinguistic documentary examining American English dialects and accents and perceptions thereof.

It was produced and directed by Louis Alvarez and Andrew Kolker. The Center for New American Media won a Peabody Award for the film in 1987. It aired on the first season of the PBS series POV in 1988.

External links
 
 American Tongues at the Center for New American Media

1988 television films
1988 films
American documentary television films
Documentary films about words and language
Peabody Award-winning broadcasts
1988 documentary films
Documentary films about the United States
1980s English-language films
1980s American films